General elections in the Netherlands Antilles took place on 18 January 2002.

Results

References

Elections in the Netherlands Antilles
Netherlands Antilles
General election